Stephen Southmyd Fenn (March 28, 1820 – April 13, 1892) was a congressional territorial delegate from the Idaho Territory.

Born in Watertown, Connecticut, Fenn moved with his parents to Niagara County, New York, in 1824.
He attended the public schools and moved in 1841 to Jackson County, Iowa, where he held several local offices. Fenn moved to California in 1850 and engaged in mining and ranching, studied law, and was admitted to the bar in 1862 and commenced practice in that part of Washington Territory which became a part of the Territory of Idaho upon its organization in 1863. He also engaged in mining and served as member of the Idaho Territorial council 1864-1867.

Fenn served as district attorney for the first judicial district in 1869 and served as member of the Territorial legislature in 1872 and served as speaker of the house. He engaged in agricultural pursuits and successfully contested as a Democrat the election of Thomas W. Bennett to the Forty-fourth Congress. Fenn was reelected to the Forty-fifth Congress and served from June 23, 1876, to March 3, 1879. He was not a candidate for renomination in 1878 and continued his former pursuits until July 1891. Fenn died in Blackfoot, Idaho, on April 13, 1892, and was interred in its Asylum Cemetery.

The community of Fenn on the Camas Prairie in Idaho County is named for Fenn and his son, Major Frank A. Fenn (1853–1927), buried in Kooskia.

References

External links

1820 births
1892 deaths
People from Watertown, Connecticut
Members of the Idaho Territorial Legislature
Delegates to the United States House of Representatives from Idaho Territory
Idaho Democrats
19th-century American politicians